was a town located in Ama District, Aichi Prefecture, Japan.

As of 2003 the town had an estimated population of 29,875 and a density of 1,601.88 persons per km². The total area was 18.65 km².

On April 1, 2005, Saya, along with the town of Saori, and the villages of Hachikai and Tatsuta (all from Ama District), was merged to create the city Aisai.

Dissolved municipalities of Aichi Prefecture
Aisai, Aichi